Ferdinand  is a 2017 American computer-animated adventure comedy film produced by Blue Sky Studios and distributed by 20th Century Fox. The film, a loose remake of Ferdinand the Bull, and loosely based on Munro Leaf and Robert Lawson's 1936 children's book The Story of Ferdinand, was written by Robert L. Baird, Tim Federle, and Brad Copeland, and directed by Carlos Saldanha. The film features an ensemble voice cast that includes John Cena, Kate McKinnon, Bobby Cannavale, Peyton Manning, Anthony Anderson, David Tennant, Tim Nordquist, Lily Day, Juanes, Jerrod Carmichael, Miguel Ángel Silvestre, Raúl Esparza, Gina Rodriguez, Daveed Diggs, Gabriel Iglesias, Flula Borg, Boris Kodjoe, and Sally Phillips. The music for the film was composed by John Powell, making it his eighth and final collaboration with Blue Sky before it shut down on April 10, 2021. The story, written by Ron Burch, David Kidd, and Don Rhymer, follows a gentle pacifist bull named Ferdinand who refuses to participate in bullfighting but is forced back into the arena where his beliefs are challenged when he faces off against the world's greatest bullfighter.

Ferdinand premiered on December 10, 2017 in Los Angeles, and was theatrically released in the United States on December 15, 2017 in 3D and 2D formats and received mixed-to-positive reviews from critics and audiences. It was a box office bomb at the North American box office, but fared better internationally, grossing $296 million worldwide against a production budget of $111 million. Ferdinand received a nomination for Best Animated Feature at the 90th Academy Awards (losing against Coco), as well as nominations at the 75th Golden Globe Awards for Best Animated Feature Film (also lost against Coco) and Best Original Song ("Home") (losing against This Is Me). It was also the last film by Blue Sky Studios to be nominated for both an Oscar and a Golden Globe, as the studio was shut down in April 2021.

Plot

In Spain, young Ferdinand lives with other calves and bulls at Señor Moreno's "Casa del Toro", where bulls are trained for bullfighting. Ferdinand is a pacifist and loves flowers, and is bullied by the other calves Valiente, Guapo, and Bones. A matador arrives, and the calves' fathers fight to impress him. Ferdinand's father is picked, so Valiente crushes Ferdinand's favorite flower in retaliation. Ferdinand's father does not come back from the ring, and Valiente's father states his belief that "soft" bulls always die. Ferdinand runs away from Casa del Toro, and he winds up on a flower farm owned by Juan and his daughter Nina, who adopt him.

Two years later, Ferdinand has grown into an enormous but still gentle bull. Juan determines that Ferdinand looks too scary to take along to the annual Flower Festival, as in previous years. Ferdinand follows them anyway, but is stung by a bee and panics, accidentally destroying the town square. Animal Control officers deem him dangerous, and take him away before Nina and Juan can explain.

The officers decide to give Ferdinand to Casa del Toro, where he meets his old bullies Valiente, Bones, and Guapo, plus new additions such as Lupe the goat and two new bulls, Angus and Maquina. Ferdinand tries to escape but is stopped by three German Lipizzan horses.

The next day, snooty matador El Primero arrives, needing a bull for his final bullfight before retirement. Moreno puts all the bulls in a ring to fight it out, but Ferdinand refuses to take part, causing a chain of mishaps when he tries to help Guapo recover from a stage fright-induced faint. El Primero gives Moreno two days to get the bulls into shape. Guapo is sent to the slaughterhouse and Valiente informs a horrified Ferdinand that non-fighters now become meat.

That night, Ferdinand comforts Bones as he grieves for Guapo, making a friend of him. The next day, he fixes Angus' hair so he can see better, earning another friend. Ferdinand, Bones and Angus then challenge the horses to a dance off and Maquina joins in the fun, helping them win. Valiente mocks them for bonding and wasting valuable practice time, causing the other bulls to abandon Ferdinand and return to training.

With the help of the three hedgehog siblings Una, Dos and Cuatro, Ferdinand and Lupe try to escape through the house. Ferdinand finds a wall of horns in a trophy room, including his father's. Realizing that bulls die whether they are selected or not, Ferdinand goes back and warns the others to run for their lives. Valiente refuses to accept the truth and starts fighting Ferdinand, accidentally breaking off his own horn. He is taken to the slaughterhouse and Ferdinand is chosen by El Primero, who believes he deliberately injured Valiente.

Ferdinand rescues Valiente, as well as Guapo, who had not yet been killed. Together, Lupe, the bulls and the hedgehogs steal Moreno's truck and flee to Madrid.  El Primero threatens Moreno that if his staff does not catch Ferdinand, El Primero will fight Moreno in the ring instead. They abandon the truck and flee on foot to the Atocha train station. Ferdinand helps the others get aboard the train, but sacrifices himself to buy them time to get away. He is captured and brought to the ring, but a video of the bulls' escape has made the news. Recognizing Ferdinand on TV, Paco alerts Juan and Nina, who hurry to Madrid to save Ferdinand.

In Las Ventas Arena, Ferdinand refuses to fight and starts running around in blind panic, accidentally knocking over and humiliating El Primero. El Primero wounds him with a banderilla and Ferdinand nearly retaliates until he sees a carnation crushed beneath his hoof, which he smells, and thinks of his home while doing so. After smelling the flower and not wishing to hurt anyone, Ferdinand spares El Primero and sits down, waiting to be killed. The crowd yells for El Primero to let Ferdinand live and he decides to put down his sword and leave with dignity. Through his pacifism, Ferdinand becomes the first bull to survive a bullfight and is reunited with Nina. Moreno then brings Lupe, Ferdinand and the rest of the bulls to live at Nina's farm. A Mid-credit scene shows that Una, Dos and Cuatro’s missing brother, Tres returns, much to the sibling’s surprise.

Voice cast
John Cena as Ferdinand, a big-hearted flower loving Spanish bull who does not want to fight and believes in looking out for others.
Colin H. Murphy voices a calf Ferdinand.
Kate McKinnon as Lupe, an old calming goat and Ferdinand's self-appointed mentor.
Bobby Cannavale as Valiente, an aggressive and arrogant bull who bullies Ferdinand for his flower-loving personality and reluctance to fight. He was the last bull to befriend Ferdinand.
Jack Gore voices a calf Valiente.
Cannavale also voices Valiente's father, a cruel and ferocious bull who hates everyone, including his son. His attitude rubs off on Valiente.
Peyton Manning as Guapo, a brash and loudmouthed bull who has stage fright and is also bullied by Valiente. He is the fourth bull to befriend Ferdinand.
Jet Jurgensmeyer voices a calf Guapo
Anthony Anderson as Bones, an undersized but agile and fast bull. He is Guapo's friend, and the first of the bulls to befriend Ferdinand.
Nile Diaz voices a calf Bones
David Tennant as Angus, a Scottish Highland bull who had hair over his eyes until Ferdinand licked it. He is the second bull to befriend Ferdinand.
Tim Nordquist as Maquina, a lab-cloned Belted Galloway who never speaks, but only grunts and growls. He is the third bull to befriend Ferdinand.
Lily Day as Nina, the original owner of Paco and Ferdinand. She and her father later adopt Lupe, and all of Moreno's bulls.
Julia Scarpa Saldanha voices a young Nina. 
Juanes as Juan, the father of Nina.
Jerrod Carmichael as Paco, a dog owned by Nina and Juan
Miguel Ángel Silvestre as El Primero, an egotistical matador.
Raúl Esparza as Moreno, the owner of Casa del Toro, who wants to impress Primero.
Gina Rodriguez as Una, a short violet hedgehog who is Dos and Cuatro's sister.
Daveed Diggs as Dos, a skinny indigo hedgehog, Una and Cuatro's brother
Gabriel Iglesias as Cuatro, a chubby blue hedgehog, Una and Dos' brother
Flula Borg as Hans, a horse at Casa del Toro.
Boris Kodjoe as Klaus, a horse at Casa del Toro.
Sally Phillips as Greta, a horse at Casa del Toro.
Jeremy Sisto as Raf, Ferdinand's father who died in a bullfight.
Cindy Slattery as Bunny, a red rabbit.

Production
In 2011, it was reported that 20th Century Fox Animation had acquired the rights to the children's book The Story of Ferdinand by Munro Leaf to adapt it into a computer-animated feature film with Carlos Saldanha attached to direct it. In May 2013, Fox titled the film simply Ferdinand, which would be produced by Blue Sky Studios. John Powell, a frequent collaborator with Saldanha, would be composing the film's score. In November 2016, it was reported that Gabriel Iglesias would voice a character named Cuatro, a chubby blue hedgehog, Una and Dos' brother.

Soundtrack

On September 19, 2017, it was announced that singer Nick Jonas wrote and recorded a song called "Home" for the film, released as the promotional single of the soundtrack on October 20, 2017. A second original song by Jonas, "Watch Me", was released alongside the six-song EP on December 1. It features three original tracks, with the third song "Lay Your Head On Me" by Juanes.

It was the last time Powell composed a Blue Sky film before the studio shut down on April 10, 2021. His score was released by Fox Music on December 15, 2017.

Release

In May 2013, Fox scheduled the film for April 7, 2017 release. In February 2016, the release date was pushed back from its original release date of April 7, 2017 to July 21, 2017. In August 2016, the release date was again pushed back, this time from July 21, 2017 to December 22, 2017, taking over the release date of DreamWorks Animation's The Croods: A New Age, before that film was temporarily cancelled, put back in production, and eventually released on November 25, 2020 by its new distributor Universal Pictures. In February 2017, the film was moved up by one week from December 22, 2017 to December 15, 2017. The first trailer premiered on March 28, 2017, followed by the second trailer on June 14, 2017.

Home media / streaming 
Ferdinand was released on Digital HD on February 27, 2018, and was released on DVD and Blu-ray on March 13, 2018.

The film was made available for streaming on Disney+ on January 8, 2021.

Reception

Box office
Ferdinand has grossed $84.4 million in the United States and Canada, underperforming at the North American box office, and $211.6 million in other countries, for a worldwide total of $296 million, against a production budget of $111 million.

In the United States and Canada, Ferdinand was released alongside Star Wars: The Last Jedi, and was projected to gross $15–20 million from 3,621 theaters in its opening weekend. It made $350,000 from Thursday night previews at 2,385 theaters, which began at 5 P.M. and $3.6 million on its first day. It went on to open to $13.3 million, finishing second behind The Last Jedi.

Critical response
The site's critical consensus reads, "Ferdinands colorful update on a classic tale doesn't go anywhere unexpected, but its timeless themes – and John Cena's engaging voice work in the title role – make for family-friendly fun." On Metacritic, the film has a weighted average score of 58 out of 100, based on 20 critics, indicating "mixed or average reviews". Audience polled by CinemaScore gave the film an average grade of "A" on an A+ to F scale.

Spanish bullfighting critic of El País, Antonio Lorca, in a critique of the film said that the film's message is "profoundly unnatural", and that the "renunciation" of the lead character to its "animal nature" is a lie that manipulates children, who will become "tomorrow's anti-bullfighters". El Diario.es commented on this article by Lorca, saying that it had been widely commented on social networks and that the anti-bullfighting narrative of the film "raised hackles" for its message against animal abuse, which can also be interpreted as "fight against school bullying" and "implicit defense of sexual and gender diversity". Ben Kenigsberg of The New York Times gave the film a positive review, saying, "Unlike in the book, Ferdinand earns the arena's cheers for not fighting, but the crowd's sense of surprise will elude audiences attending Ferdinand." Susan Wloszczyna of Rogerebert.com gave the film a three out of four stars and said, "Enough of that kind of bull. What the world needs now is Ferdinand, sweet Ferdinand, a rare breed of bovine who takes a stand against aggression, competitive rivalry and conforming to the expectations of others." James Dyer of Empire Magazine gave the film a three out of five stars, saying, "Inoffensive fun, but unlike its paperback forbear, the cinematic Ferdinand is unlikely to stand the test of time."

Simran Hans of The Guardian gave the film a four out of five stars and said, "A flower-sniffing bull goes on a journey of self-discovery in this fun adaptation of a 30s children's book." Michael Rechtshaffen of The Hollywood Reporter also gave a positive review for the film, saying, "It's no Coco, but Ferdinand, a CG-animated adaptation of the classic 1936 Munro Leaf and Robert Lawson book about a flower-loving bull who'd rather sniff than fight, manages to squeak by with enough charming set-pieces and amusing sight gags to compensate for a stalling storyline." Katie Welsh of Chicago Tribune gave the film a negative review of two stars, saying, "With a lovely voice performance from Cena, the spirit of Ferdinand does shine through. But the rest of the story filler is mostly forgettable." Tara Brady of The Irish Times also gave the film a three out of five stars, saying, "Ferdinand may lack the all-out charm offensive of the studio's 2015 Snoopy and Charlie Brown vehicle, but it's not too far off in terms of quality and sweetness."

Accolades

References

External links

 
 
 
 

2017 films
2017 3D films
2017 computer-animated films
2010s American animated films
2010s adventure films
American 3D films
American children's animated adventure films
American children's animated comedy films
Animated films about mammals
Animated films about orphans
Animated films based on children's books
Bullfighting films
Films set in Spain
Films scored by John Powell
Films directed by Carlos Saldanha
Films produced by John Davis
Films with screenplays by Brad Copeland
20th Century Fox films
20th Century Fox animated films
20th Century Fox Animation films
Blue Sky Studios films
Davis Entertainment films
3D animated films
2017 comedy films
Films set in Madrid
2010s English-language films
Films about cattle